Chamar is the highest peak of the Sringi (or Serang) Himal, which is a subrange of the Nepalese Himalayas. Chamar and the entire Sringi Himal lie in Central Nepal, just south of the Tibetan border, between the Shyar Khola valley on the east and the Tom Khola–Trisuli Gandaki valley on the west. Chamar is about 90 km northwest of Kathmandu, and about 25 km east of Manaslu, the nearest eight-thousander.

Notable features
The Sringi Himal is small in land area and remote even by Himalayan standards; it has seen little visitation from outsiders.

Although low in elevation among the major mountains of Nepal, Chamar is exceptional in its steep rise above local terrain. For example, it rises 5500 m from the Tom Khola/Trisuli Gandaki confluence in a horizontal distance of about 13 km.

Climbing history
There is no record of attempts on this mountain prior to the successful first ascent in 1953. In May–June of that year, a party from the Tararua Tramping Club of Wellington, New Zealand climbed the peak via the Northeast Ridge route, placing five camps.

The party climbed without oxygen. The first ascent of the peak was made by Maurice Bishop and Sherpa Namgyal on 5 June 1953. The following day Phil Gardner, Graham McCallum and Sherpa Nima also reached the summit.

The Himalayan Index lists three more unsuccessful attempts,  in 1983, 1994, and 2000, but no more ascents of the peak.

References

Sources
H. Adams Carter, "Classification of the Himalaya," American Alpine Journal 1985.
Jill Neate, High Asia: An Illustrated History of the 7000 Metre Peaks, 
Himalayan Index
DEM files for the Himalaya (Corrected versions of SRTM data)

External links
A list of mountains ranked by local relief and steepness showing Chamar as the world #23.
Picture of Chamar

Mountains of the Gandaki Province